The Zemun Polje Airfield, also referred to as "May 13th Airfield", ( or ) is located on left side of the Belgrade-Novi Sad road, parallel to the railway for about 500–600 m before road turns towards Batajnica. It mostly sports- and amateur aeroplanes.

External links 
Aerodrom "13 Maj" Web site (Serbian)

Airports in Serbia